Friedrich Gustav Piffl (15 October 1864 – 21 April 1932) was a Cardinal of the Roman Catholic Church and Archbishop of Vienna.

Gustav Piffl was born in Lanškroun, Bohemia, in what was then the Austrian Empire. He was the son of Rudolf Piffl who was a bookseller and shopkeeper. He volunteered for a year in the Austrian army in his early life. After deciding to become a priest he entered the Teutonic College of S. Maria in Camposanto in Rome and later the Sankt'Augustin monastery, Austria. He joined the Congregation of the Canons Regular of Saint Augustine in 1883 taking the name Friedrich. He finished his studies at the University of Vienna, where he studied philosophy.

Priesthood
He was ordained on 8 January 1888. He worked in the Archdiocese of Vienna from 1888 until 1892 in spiritual work. He was the pastor and prior of the collegiate church of Klosterneuburg until 1913 and its provost from 1907 to 1913.

Episcopate
Pope Pius X appointed him Archbishop of Vienna on 2 May 1913. He was consecrated on 1 June 1913. Pope Pius raised him to the Cardinalate, creating him Cardinal-Priest of S. Marco on 25 May 1914. He participated in the conclaves of 1914 that elected Pope Benedict XV and 1922 that elected Pope Pius XI. He was the last prince-archbishop of Vienna, holding office at the dissolution of Austria-Hungary in 1918. He died in 1932 in Vienna at the age of 67.

1864 births
1932 deaths
People from Lanškroun
People from the Kingdom of Bohemia
20th-century Austrian cardinals
Cardinals created by Pope Pius X
Archbishops of Vienna
Austrian people of German Bohemian descent